The 1998–99 season was Ethnikos Piraeus' 5th first-tier season in the 1990s and the 49th in total. Not managing a single league victory, the team was relegated and also exited early in the cup. It remains the last top flight appearance for Ethnikos.

Players

Squad

|}

Players who left during the season

|}

Managers
Georgios Ioakimidis: start of season – 14 September 1998
Vasilis Papachristou (caretaker): 14 September 1998 – 10 November 1998
Lysandros Georgamlis (caretaker): 10 November 1998 – 3 December 1998
Howard Kendall: 3 December 1998 – 14 September 1998
Panagiotis Alexopoulos: 18 March 1999 – 30 June 1999

Alpha Ethniki

League table

References
Weltfussball

Ethnikos Piraeus F.C. seasons
Ethnikos Piraeus